Jo Tankers, based in Norway, was one of the world's main providers of deep-sea transportation services for chemicals and other high value liquids.

Since 1915 Odfjell family in Bergen were involved in shipping. They started with the transport of timber. As a consequence the Jo Tankers' vessels named after trees. In the 1930s the first tanker was built and in the 1950s they entered the chemical tanker trade.

Jo Tankers has been acquired by Stolt-Nielsen in 2016. Stolt-Nielsen has over time painted the ships from the orange color into the Stolt-Nielsen colors.  As the Jo Tankers fleet consisted out of a number of early 1990's tankers, a number of Jo Tankers ships have been beached and dismantled. Ships aging above 25 years are considered too old for most major oil compagnies to be accepted as charter.

External links
Jo Tankers homepage

Shipping companies of Norway
Chemical shipping companies
Companies based in Bergen
Companies with year of establishment missing